Nicolai Henrich Jæger (28 January 1780 – 13 July 1846) was a Norwegian lawyer and philologist.

References

1780 births
1846 deaths
19th-century Norwegian lawyers